Alpha Cancri (α Cancri, abbreviated Alpha Cnc, α Cnc), also named Acubens , is a star system in the constellation of Cancer.

Nomenclature
α Cancri (Latinised to Alpha Cancri) is the star's Bayer designation.

The traditional name Acubens (Açubens) is derived from the Arabic  , 'the claws'. A second name, Sertan , derives from the Arabic al-saraṭān, 'the crab'. The International Astronomical Union Working Group on Star Names (WGSN) choose 'Acubens' as the proper name for this star.

Properties 

Alpha Cancri is a fourth-magnitude star with an apparent magnitude of 4.20, making it barely visible to the naked eye under good lighting conditions. Nevertheless, it is 23 times more luminous than the Sun. Its stellar classification is given as kA7VmF0/2III/IVSr, indicating an Am star with calcium K-lines similar to an A7 main sequence star and hydrogen lines more like an F0 giant or subgiant star. The distance of Alpha Cancri calculated from the Gaia Data Release 2 parallax is roughly 50 parsecs from Earth, or approximately 164 light-years away.

Since it is near the ecliptic, it can be occulted by the Moon and very rarely by planets.

Star system 

The primary component, α Cancri A, is a white A-type main-sequence dwarf with an apparent magnitude of +4.26. Its companion, α Cancri B, is an eleventh-magnitude star. In the year 1836, its position angle was observed at 325 degrees with a separation from the main star α Cancri A of 11.3 arcseconds.

From studying its light curve during occultation, it is thought that α Cancri A may itself be a close binary, consisting of two stars with similar brightness and a separation of 0.1 arcsecond.

In modern culture
USS Acubens (AKS-5) was a United States Navy ship.

References

External links 
Jim Kaler's Stars, University of Illinois: Acubens

Cancri, Alpha
Cancer (constellation)
Binary stars
A-type main-sequence stars
Acubens
076756
044066
Cancri, 65
BD+12 1948
3572
Am stars
Suspected variables
F-type giants